Jose Luis Castro Colman (born 10 November 1985) is a Paraguayan international footballer who plays for A.C. Este, as a defender.

References

1985 births
Living people
Paraguayan footballers
Paraguay international footballers
Serie B players
A.S. Cittadella players
F.C. Pro Vercelli 1892 players
Paraguayan expatriate footballers
Expatriate footballers in Italy
Association football defenders
Pol. Alghero players